The Thamesmead Housing Co-operative was a housing estate in Thamesmead, South East London in the London Borough of Greenwich. It was a purpose built housing cooperative and like others it was an experiment in building close-knit communities and as a way of helping single people and couples.

It was dissolved in the 1990s and taken over by Hyde Housing Association (now The Hyde Group).

Co-operative

Thamesmead Housing Co-operative was established to address the lack of housing for vulnerable single people in the area. Applicants to live on the CO-op were interviewed in order to establish their housing needs and also their ability to co-exist with others in shared houses. New tenants were required to purchase a £1 share in order to become a member of the co-operative, which entitled them to attend and vote in the annual general meeting, to elect or stand for the management committee, participate in the co-operative’s affairs and receive its services.

The co-operative consisted of an enclave of 40 flats and 20 shared houses in red brick. The flats were intended for couples but not families and the houses were shared by 4 - 6 people, some having a purpose build disabled unit attached. The buildings were laid out in five courtyards with addresses in Blyth Road and Slocum Close.
A hall and office were provided for purpose of holding meetings and managing the co-operative.

Transfer to Hyde Housing
Difficulties in running the co-operative as a stand-alone project led to the involvement of Hyde Housing Association, which took over the management of the properties around 1990. Later it was established that the transfer process had not been correctly handled, and the process was properly completed in the late 1990s. During the transition period the project ran under two names, the original Thamesmead Housing Co-Op and the ill-fated Hyde Housing version known as "Thamesmead Management Co-Op" at 29 Blyth Road, London, SE28 8LJ, which was not recognized by the responsible Government body "The Housing Corporation" and caused the delay in formal transfer to Hyde Housing. Among the founder members were Graham Simpson, who later became the last chair of the original co-op, Paul Clewlow, treasurer, and Dave O'Brien, all who had lived on the scheme for a number of years. In its death throes the co-op was subject to a large number of fraudulent housing applications from Nigerian applicants who saw it as a source of cheap student accommodation rather than the having the common goal of the original ethos and as a result the ethnic make-up consisted of 96% African 3% British and 1% Asian. This was wildly disproportionate and different to the local boroughs ethnicity and at that time made it stand out. Subsequently, Thamesmead as a whole has been the favored residential starting point in the UK for most arriving West Africans to the extent that it is now known locally as "Little Lagos".

The properties have continued as a shared housing scheme.

See also
 Clays Lane Estate across the river
 Deptford Housing Co-operative is still running
 Sanford Housing Co-operative is still running

References

External links
 The Hyde Group

Housing estates in the Royal Borough of Greenwich
Housing cooperatives in the United Kingdom